Laugh in a Half was a Canadian comedy anthology show broadcast on CBC Radio One in 2003. Hosted by Walter Rinaldi, it was a summer replacement show for Madly Off in All Directions that ran for 13-weeks from June to late August of that year.

Each show focused on a particular topic, such as "pioneers of comedy", "British comedy" or "comedy duos", and then played well-known comedy skits from various performers on that theme. Over the course of the series the show played pieces by famous British, American and Canadian comedians, including Abbott and Costello, Monty Python and The Frantics.

CBC Radio One programs
2003 radio programme debuts
2003 radio programme endings
Canadian radio sketch shows